Spectrum 7 was an oil company started by William DeWitt and Mercer Reynolds.

In 1984, Spectrum 7 merged with George W. Bush's Arbusto Energy.  After the merger, Bush became the Chairman and CEO of Spectrum 7.

According to George Soros, Bush's presence at Spectrum 7 made the failing company more attractive than it would otherwise have been.

References 

Defunct oil companies of the United States
Petroleum in Texas
George W. Bush
Energy companies established in 1984
Non-renewable resource companies established in 1984
Defunct companies based in Texas